The 2021 UEFA Nations League Finals was an international football tournament held in Italy from 6 to 10 October 2021. The four national teams involved in the tournament were required to register a squad of up to 23 players – of which three had to be goalkeepers – by 30 September 2021, 23:59 CEST (UTC+2), six days prior to the opening match of the tournament. Only players in these squads were eligible to take part in the tournament.

In the event that a player on the submitted squad list suffered from an injury or illness prior to his team's first match of the tournament, that player could be replaced, provided that the team doctor and a doctor from the UEFA Medical Committee both confirmed that the injury or illness was severe enough to prevent the player from participating in the tournament. Players who either tested positive for SARS-CoV-2 or had been declared as "close contacts" of a positive SARS-CoV-2 tested person – and therefore were put in isolation by the decision of health authorities – were considered cases of serious illness and could therefore be replaced before the first match. If a group of players of a team were placed into mandatory quarantine or self-isolation prior to a match following a decision from national or local health officials due to positive SARS-CoV-2 tests, and fewer than 13 players were available (including at least one goalkeeper), additional players could be called up to meet the minimum of 13 players required. In such a case, an equivalent number of quarantined players had to be definitively withdrawn from the 23-player list.

The position listed for each player is per the official squad lists published by UEFA. The age listed for each player is their age as of 6 October 2021, the first day of the tournament. The numbers of caps and goals listed for each player do not include any matches played after the start of the tournament. The club listed is the club for which the player last played a competitive match prior to the tournament. The nationality for each club reflects the national association (not the league) to which the club is affiliated. A flag is included for coaches who are of a different nationality to their team.

Belgium
Manager:  Roberto Martínez

Belgium's final squad was announced on 1 October 2021, with Matz Sels also selected as a stand-by goalkeeper. Thomas Meunier withdrew injured and was replaced by Thomas Foket on 5 October. Thorgan Hazard withdrew injured and was replaced by Arthur Theate on 6 October.

France
Manager: Didier Deschamps

France's final squad was announced on 30 September 2021.

Italy
Manager: Roberto Mancini

Italy's final squad was announced on 30 September 2021. Ciro Immobile and Rafael Tolói withdrew injured and were replaced by Moise Kean and Davide Calabria, respectively, on 3 October. Matteo Pessina withdrew injured and was replaced by Federico Dimarco on 4 October.

Spain
Manager: Luis Enrique

Spain's final squad was announced on 30 September 2021. Pedri withdrew injured and was replaced by Brais Méndez on 1 October. Marcos Llorente and Brais Méndez withdrew injured and were replaced by Bryan Gil and Sergi Roberto, respectively, on 3 October.

References

External links

Squads
UEFA Nations League final tournament squads